When Were You Born is a 1938 murder mystery film directed by William C. McGann and starring Anna May Wong as an astrologer who helps the police. Each of the twelve principal characters was born under a different astrological sign.

Plot
On an ocean liner sailing from the Orient to San Francisco, Mei Lei Ming gives fellow passenger Nita Kenton a reading. When Nita's boyfriend, importer Phillip Corey, scoffs at her predictions, she informs him that he himself will die within 48 hours.

Corey is later found dead in his San Francisco shop, an apparent suicide. Police Inspector Jim C. Gregg is certain it is a homicide and has Sergeant Kelly bring Mei Lei in for questioning. She convinces him she is innocent and, after demonstrating her astrological powers by telling both skeptical policemen about themselves based solely on their birth dates, proceeds to help them solve the case and two subsequent, related killings. Police forensic scientist Dr. Merton, however, remains firmly scornful of Mei Lei's unscientific methods.

When Corey's Chinese business partner Frederick Gow shows up at the police station, he recognizes Juggler Barrows, who has been brought in for questioning about an unrelated crime. He pretends to cough and uses a handkerchief to conceal his face from Barrows as he enters Gregg's office. There, he announces that he wants to recover certain business letters from Corey's safe. Mei Lei becomes suspicious. When the letters Gow wanted are later examined, Mei Lei discovers a coded message that indicates Corey and Gow were involved in drug smuggling.

Corey was engaged to Doris Kane, though she herself was not attracted to the man, preferring instead crack shot Larry Camp. Under questioning, Kane later reluctantly reveals that Corey had blackmailed her mother into pressuring her to accept the arrangement. She also acknowledges that she went to Corey's home the night he was killed to try to persuade him to break the engagement. She was followed by Camp, who then quarreled with the victim. A shot was fired, but Camp claims that Corey fired at him. Corey's valet, Shields is also a suspect.

Meanwhile, Gow runs into Juggler Barrows. Barrows is astonished to see him, as Gow had deceived him into believing he was Corey. Gow is relieved to ascertain that Sergeant Kelly did not believe Barrows when he claimed to have spoken to "Corey" some time after the real Corey had been killed. He lures Barrows away. Later, Barrows' dead body is flung from a speeding car.

Convinced that Gow is the killer, Gregg goes to his apartment with Mei Lei and some policemen to search the place. Gow escapes through a hidden passageway. He spots Mei Lei alone in his reading room and takes her captive. However, Shields had seen Gow entering the secret passageway and followed. He shoots Gow dead. Mei Lei, seeing how good a shot he is, gets him to admit he killed his employer. Gow had hired Barrows to open Corey's safe. When Corey returned unexpectedly, they hid. Shields entered the room at just the wrong moment and was accused of theft. He was forced to shoot Corey in self-defense.

Cast
 Margaret Lindsay as Doris Kane (Leo)
 Anna May Wong as Mei Lei Ming (Aquarius)
 Lola Lane as Nita Kenton (Cancer)
 Anthony Averill as Larry Camp (Aries)
 Charles C. Wilson as Inspector Jim C. Gregg (Taurus)
 Jeffrey Lynn as Davis (Gemini)
 Eric Stanley as Shields (Virgo)
 James Stephenson as Phillip Corey (Libra)
 Leonard Mudie as Frederick Gow (Scorpio)
 Olin Howland as Peter Finlay (Sagittarius)
 Maurice Cass as Dr. Merton (Capricorn)
 Frank Jaquet as Sergeant Kelly (Pisces)

References

External links
 
 
  
 

1938 films
American mystery films
American black-and-white films
Films directed by William C. McGann
Warner Bros. films
1938 mystery films
1930s American films
Films scored by Bernhard Kaun
Films about murder
Films set in San Francisco
Astrology
Films about astrology